Yahya Khan is an Afghan cricketer. He made his first-class debut for Amo Region in the 2017–18 Ahmad Shah Abdali 4-day Tournament on 20 October 2017. He made his Twenty20 debut on 12 September 2020, for Amo Sharks in the 2020 Shpageeza Cricket League. He made his List A debut on 21 October 2021, for Amo Region in the 2021 Ghazi Amanullah Khan Regional One Day Tournament.

References

External links
 

Year of birth missing (living people)
Living people
Afghan cricketers
Amo Sharks cricketers
Place of birth missing (living people)